Harrison R. Briggs was an American minor league baseball player and an college football and college baseball coach. He served as the head football coach at Marshall University in Huntington, West Virginia in 1923.

Head coaching record

Football

Baseball

References

External links
 

Year of birth missing
Year of death missing
Marshall Thundering Herd football coaches
Marshall Thundering Herd baseball coaches
New Bedford Whalers (baseball) players
High school football coaches in Pennsylvania